Triarthria is a genus of flies in the family Tachinidae.

Species
T. legeri (Villeneuve, 1908)
T. setipennis (Fallén, 1810)

References

Tachininae
Tachinidae genera
Taxa named by James Francis Stephens